Tom Michael Fenchel (born 19 March 1940, in Copenhagen) is a Danish marine ecologist and professor first at the University of Aarhus, later at the University of Copenhagen. He is a highly cited scientist and known for, among other things, Fenchel's Law.

Education
Fenchel holds PhD (1964) and Doctor of Science (1969) degrees, both from the University of Copenhagen.

Awards and honours
He is a foreign member of the Royal Society and a reviewing editor of the scientific journal Science. He was the 1986 recipient of the ECI Prize of ecology and wrote the book  in the ECI Prize laureate series Excellence in Ecology. He served as president 2004-2008 of the Royal Danish Academy of Sciences and Letters (he has been a member since 1976). In 2006 he was awarded the A.C. Redfield Lifetime Achievement Award by the American Society of Limnology and Oceanography.

He is a member of the Norwegian Academy of Science and Letters and of the American National Academy of Sciences

References

1940 births
Living people
Danish ecologists
20th-century Danish botanists
University of Copenhagen alumni
Academic staff of Aarhus University
Academic staff of the University of Copenhagen
Foreign Members of the Royal Society
Members of the Norwegian Academy of Science and Letters
Foreign associates of the National Academy of Sciences
21st-century Danish botanists